, also known as  is an  video derived from Final Fantasy X. It was posted on YouTube and Niconico on May 7, 2022, and was deleted on June 6, about a month later. In the end, it became a popular topic that recorded more than 3.1 million views, but the part that became popular in the video became a problem by treated characters of the game as homosexual, the production also seems to be related with ridicule or insult to LGBTQ+, and a series of topics were consumed as an entertainment by Internet users.

Timeline 
As it became popular, "FINAL FANTASY X | X-2 HD Remaster" was onto a ranked list of the most popular games in the "RPG" category of Steam. At the same time, there was a debate about ridiculing or insulting the characters as homosexual. On 6 June, about a month later after the video was posted, it was deleted from Niconico by the request from Square Enix. In the end, it recorded more than 3.1 million views. After the deletion, Rug Mat posted on his Twitter "Thanks for watching the video! I'm sorry!", and declared that he had no plans to repost the video.

Content 
Oto Wakka is a derivative works of Final Fantasy X. It is a video of a genre called otoMAD, which combines a medley style music with jokes surrounding Wakka, a character of the game. In the part using "Connect" (the opening theme of Puella Magi Madoka Magica), Wakka is treated as a homosexual who shouting repeatedly obscene words, and yearning for Tidus. This part was especially spread on social networking services (SNSs) as a meme, and derivative videos were made one after another.

Influence and reaction 
Since more than ten years ago, there have been topics on the Internet that treat Wakka as a homosexual arose from his body and molding. Also, in Niconico, content that treats homosexuals in ridiculous or insulting such as the topic of "A Midsummer Night's Wet Dream" (contents modified from a video works for homosexuals) has acquired deep-rooted popularity. There were many criticisms to Oto Wakka (to be descended from this), but the direction to consume as an entertainment was also large. There are a objection that this is bright humor and not discrimination, and a refutation that it is an era that cannot be evasion as humor. On the other hand, there were many opinions that it was appropriate to be deleted by copyright infringement, and there were also positive opinions about the deletion. Within the day it was deleted, Shigetaka Kurita (chief operating officer of Dwango, which operates Niconico) didn't the name explicitly and tweeted "It's become a legend, don't be sad. It was fun".

AUTOMATON (video game website) published the article on 25 May. On 7 June, they changed the author to the AUTOMATON editorial department and apologized for this article with strikethroughs throughout the article. The reason is that they received a series of criticisms that it should not be published uncritically because it contains expressions that insult homosexuality. They also say they will re-examine the handling of Internet culture and take steps to measures to prevent recurrence.

See also 
 YouTube
 Niconico
 Final Fantasy X

Notes

References 

Derivative works
Final Fantasy X
LGBT in Japan
Sexuality and gender-related prejudices